Souza's shrike (Lanius souzae) is a species of bird in the family Laniidae. It was named after Portuguese zoologist José Augusto de Sousa (1836 - 1889).

It occurs in the Miombo woodland.

References

Souza's shrike
Birds of Central Africa
Souza's shrike
Taxonomy articles created by Polbot